Nachman Ben-Yehuda (born 8 March 1948) is a professor emeritus and former dean of the department of sociology and anthropology at the Hebrew University in Jerusalem, Israel.

Masada myth

One of his notable subjects of research is the fall of the Masada fortress, the last refuge of a Jewish group, the Sicarii, to the Romans in 73 CE. The Sicarii committed mass suicide rather than surrender to slavery.

He views the story of Masada, as presented in the early decades of the State of Israel, as a modern legend. According to his book Sacrificing Truth, the rendition of Josephus was embellished before and after the establishment of the State of Israel. Based on transcripts of the 1963-65 archaeological dig, he claims that the team, led by Yigael Yadin, a former chief of staff of the Israel Defense Forces, fraudulently misrepresented findings and artifacts to fit within a pre-scripted narrative.

Ben-Yehuda compared the story as reported in the sole historical source, Flavius Josephus, to the myth that developed during the Zionist movement from the 1940s to the 1960s. He examined how archaeologists, notably Yigael Yadin, interpreted their findings to conform to the myth.

According to Ben-Yehuda, Josephus describes the Sicarii unflatteringly. They assassinated their Jewish opponents, and would not help the Jewish Zealots who were besieged in Jerusalem. They raided nearby villages, including Ein Gedi, where they murdered 700 Jewish women and children. They offered no resistance to the Romans, and their suicide was cowardly, unheroic and unwise.

Ben-Yehuda himself was brought up on the Masada myth, and climbed Masada himself to watch the sun rise over the Dead Sea. Israeli youth movements visited Masada, and it was the location for military swearing-in ceremonies. According to the myth, the Jews at Masada were Zealots who escaped the destruction of Jerusalem and continued to harass the Romans. Ben-Yehuda quotes Moshe Dayan calling Masada "a symbol of heroism and of Liberty for the Jewish people to whom it says: Fight to death rather than surrender."

Contrary to Josephus, the myth claims that the rebels are "Zealots" rather than Sicarii, Masada was a rebel base for attacks on the Romans. The massacre in Ein Gedi disappears.

Ben-Yehuda compared Yadin's tape-recorded notes during the excavations with Yadin's later statements. For example, Yadin's team found three skeletons, of a woman, a man and a child. On the tape, Yadin said that they could not have been a family. In later writings, Yadin said that they were the remains of an important commander, his wife, and their child. Ben-Yehuda believes that Yadin's distortions were ideologically motivated.

Selected books
 Fraud and Misconduct in Research: Detection, Investigation, and Organizational Response, with Amalya Oliver-Lumerman (University of Michigan Press, 2017)
 Atrocity, Deviance, and Submarine Warfare: Norms and Practices during the World Wars (University of Michigan Press, 2013)

References
 Sacrificing Truth: Archaeology and The Myth of Masada. Mid-60's Masada excavations forged a past through falsified evidence and concealed facts. By Nachman Ben-Yehuda (Amherst, NY: Humanity Books, an imprint of Prometheus Books) © 2002. Chapter One. Introduction: The Puzzle. Internet Archive. 
 מצדה - בין מיתוס למציאות [2015: dead link]

External links
 Prof. Nachman Ben-Yehuda, Department of the Sociology and Anthropology, Faculty of Social Sciences. The Hebrew University. Faculty page and CV. 
 History and Fable, Heroism and Fanaticism: Nachman Ben-Yehuda's The Masada Myth. Book Review by Arnold H. Green, BYU Studies Quarterly, 36:3.

Israeli sociologists
1948 births
Living people
Academic staff of the Hebrew University of Jerusalem